The Last Fall is a 2012 American drama film written and directed by Matthew A. Cherry and starring Lance Gross and Nicole Beharie.  It is Cherry's directorial debut.

Cast
Lance Gross as Kyle Bishop
Nicole Beharie as Faith Davis
Vanessa Bell Calloway as Marie Bishop
Harry Lennix as Ron Davis
Keith David as Sydney Bishop
Darrin Henson as Rell Lee
Sayeed Shahidi as Von Davis

References

External links
 
 

American drama films
2012 directorial debut films
2012 films
2010s English-language films
2010s American films